Frank Carbone (born 4 April 1965) is a former Australian rules footballer who played with St Kilda in the Victorian Football League (VFL).

Carbone, who is of Italian descent, played for CBC St Kilda originally and represented St Kilda Under-19s, before he made his VFL debut in 1985. He appeared in the opening seven rounds of the 1985 season, but played only once more that year, in round 12. His first three league games were losses by over 100 points. He didn't feature at all in the 1986 season, then played two games in 1987.

References

1965 births
Living people
Australian rules footballers from Victoria (Australia)
St Kilda Football Club players
Australian people of Italian descent
Sportspeople of Italian descent